Alcea tabrisiana is a species of flowering plant in the hollyhock genus Alcea, family Malvaceae. It is native to Turkey, the Transcaucasus, and Iran. It occurs on dry stony slopes, in mountain steppe and in forests, between 750 and 1,750 m elevation.

References

tabrisiana
Flora of Turkey
Flora of the Transcaucasus
Flora of Iran
Plants described in 1949
Taxa named by Friedrich Alexander Buhse
Taxa named by Pierre Edmond Boissier